Likely Story is an independent film production company founded by its president and CEO Anthony Bregman in October 2006 with Stefanie Azpiazu. It is based in New York City with an office in Los Angeles.

History 
New York City-based producer Anthony Bregman founded the production company 'Likely Story' in October 2006 along with his longtime working partner Stefanie Azpiazu. Azpiazu, who had been the Head of Production and Development at the NYC-based office relocated to LA-based office with its opening in November 2011.

In June 2015, Likely Story hired Peter Cron as VP Production in the film division and Jeff Stern as VP Scripted Television in the TV division, while Ryan Featherman was promoted to Story Editor also in the TV division.

Collaboration deals 
Likely Story previously had a deal with PalmStar Media to produce films together since December 2013. The company now has a first-look deal with Netflix In 2018, it has a first look TV deal with Anonymous Content.

Filmography 
 2008: Sleep Dealer
 2008: Synecdoche, New York
 2009: Carriers
 2010: Please Give
 2010: The Extra Man
 2011: Our Idiot Brother
 2011: The Oranges
 2012: Lay the Favorite
 2012: Darling Companion
 2013: Enough Said
 2013: Begin Again
 2014: Every Secret Thing
 2014: Foxcatcher
 2015: American Ultra
 2016: Sing Street
 2016: Indignation
 2016: The Whole Truth
 2016: Collateral Beauty
 2017: The Circle
 2018: Every Day
 2018: Private Life
 2018: The Land of Steady Habits
 2019: Someone Great
 2020: Downhill
 2020: The Half of It
 2020: I'm Thinking of Ending Things
 2020: Wild Mountain Thyme
 2020: Topside
 2021: Things Heard and Seen
 2021: In the Heights
 2022: Do Revenge
 2023: You Hurt My Feelings
 2023: Flora and Son

References 

Film production companies of the United States
Mass media companies established in 2006
Companies based in New York City
Companies based in Los Angeles
American independent film studios